Eknaiya is a small river or a natural tributary of Karmanasah River. Eknaiya is located in Ghazipur District of Uttar Pradesh, India. It plays its role in connecting Ganga River to Karmanasa River. It starts from Zamania and ends at Dewaitha village. Before it was a Large river consisting many tributries but as the time passed the River started drying. Know it is often refferned as a Natural canal.

References 

Canals in Uttar Pradesh